Michael Lee (born April 25, 1996) is an American professional ice hockey defenseman currently playing for HC Nové Zámky of the Slovak Extraliga.

He was an All-American for Sacred Heart.

Playing career
After attending Hamden High school and the Gunnery Prep school, Lee finished High School in Penticton British Columbia while joining the Penticton Vees and helping the club win both the league championship and the Western Canada Cup in 2015. He was able to earn a college scholarship to Vermont on the back of his stellar season. After his sophomore year, Lee left Vermont and transferred to Sacred Heart, closer to his hometown.

Lee debuted for the Pioneers in 2018 and saw a tremendous increase to his production. His arrival in Bridgeport coincided with Sacred Heart winning 16 games and posting its best season in nine years. Lee performed even better in his senior season and was named an All-American as well as the best defenseman in Atlantic Hockey. The Pioneers finished the regular season with 21 wins, tying the program record. Before they could attempt to set a new benchmark, however, the Atlantic Hockey Tournament was cancelled due to the COVID-19 pandemic.

With his college career finished, Lee was able to sign a one-year contract with the Indy Fuel. While the season was shortened as a result of the pandemic, Lee played well and finished second on the team in terms of defensive points.

Entering the 2021–22 season, Lee returned with a second one-year deal. Having increased his offensive output, Lee was placed sixth in the ECHL in scoring from the blueline with 32 points through 41 games before he was traded by the Fuel to the Kansas City Mavericks on February 17, 2022.

Career statistics

Awards and honors

References

External links

1996 births
Living people
AHCA Division I men's ice hockey All-Americans
American men's ice hockey defensemen
Ice hockey people from Connecticut
People from Hamden, Connecticut
Hartford Wolf Pack players
Indy Fuel players
Kansas City Mavericks players
Penticton Vees players
Sacred Heart Pioneers men's ice hockey players
Tri-City Storm players
Vermont Catamounts men's ice hockey players
HC Nové Zámky players
American expatriate ice hockey players in Slovakia
American expatriate ice hockey players in Canada